Les Petits Bollandistes is a 17-volume collection of lives of the saints by Paul Guerin, published in Paris in 1865.

References
Holweck, F. G. A Biographical Dictionary of the Saint. St. Louis, MO: B. Herder Book Co. 1924.

Christian hagiography
French books
1865 books